The national symbols of Kyrgyzstan are defined by Article 6 of the Constitution of Kyrgyzstan. They consist of the Flag, the Emblem, and the National Anthem.

Symbols

National anthem of Kyrgyzstan (in Russian translation)

Высокие горы, долины, поля -
Родная, заветная наша земля.
Отцы наши жили среди Ала-Тоо,
Всегда свою родину свято храня.

Припев:
Вперед, кыргызский народ,
Путем свободы вперед!
Взрастай, народ, расцветай,
Свою судьбу созидай!

Извечно народ наш для дружбы открыт,
Единство и дружбу он в сердце хранит.
Земля Кыргызстана, родная страна
Лучами согласия озарена.

Припев

Мечты и надежды отцов сбылись.
И знамя свободы возносится ввысь.
Наследье отцов наших передадим
На благо народа потомкам своим

Припев

References
 National symbols of Kyrgyzstan

See also
 National symbols of Afghanistan